Ann Pugh is an American politician who has served in the Vermont House of Representatives since 1993.

References

Living people
Union College (New York) alumni
Washington University in St. Louis alumni
University of Vermont alumni
20th-century American politicians
20th-century American women politicians
21st-century American politicians
21st-century American women politicians
Democratic Party members of the Vermont House of Representatives
Women state legislators in Vermont
Year of birth missing (living people)